Ivan Loveridge Bennett, Jr. (March 4, 1922 – July 22, 1990) was an American physician who was dean of the NYU School of Medicine and served as president of New York University 1980–1981.

Bennett was educated at Emory University where he was a member of Sigma Chi fraternity. Graduated with a  B.A. in 1943, and a medical degree in 1946. Bennett was Deputy Director of the Office of Science and Technology Policy under Lyndon B. Johnson between 1967 and 1969. Bennett was also director of the department of pathology at Johns Hopkins University and also taught at Yale and New York University.

He was elected a member of the American Academy of Arts and Sciences in 1972.

References

1922 births
1990 deaths
Presidents of New York University
Emory University alumni
Fellows of the American Academy of Arts and Sciences
20th-century American physicians
Yale University faculty
New York University faculty
Emory University School of Medicine alumni
Members of the National Academy of Medicine
20th-century American academics